Shelfanger is a village situated about 3 miles from the town of Diss in Norfolk, England. There is a church and a village hall in the village.

In years gone by there was a school, a post office, a pub, three shops, a blacksmiths and a garage run by a family of brothers called Bowman. These have all now been closed down.  Josh Kirby (died 2001), an artist lived there.

History 
The villages name means 'Shelf wood'.

This village has been previously recorded as Scelvangra, Schelfangyll, Shelfangles, Shelfhangre and Shelfhanger, though the significance of its name is largely unknown.  In 1603, it had 142 communicants and in 1736 had nearly 40 dwellinghouses, and contained about 200 inhabitants.

Notes 

http://kepn.nottingham.ac.uk/map/place/Norfolk/Shelfanger

External links

Diss Express - village's local newspaper website
shelfanger.com - village's local website, managed by the Parish Council

Villages in Norfolk
Civil parishes in Norfolk